The FSV Erlangen-Bruck is a German association football club from the suburb of Bruck in the city of Erlangen, Bavaria.

History
The club was formed on 15 May 1916, during the First World War, under the name of 1. FC Markt Bruck.

For most of its existence, the football department played on local level in the Bavarian region of Middle Franconia. The club came close to Landesliga (IV) promotion when it finished second in the Bezirksliga Mittelfranken-Nord in 1971, after having been promoted to this league the year before. The club remained in the Bezirksliga for a number of seasons without being able to archive quite so well again and eventually was relegated again.

In 1992, the FSV regained its Bezirksliga status once more. It finished in the upper half of the table in the following seasons, gaining promotion to the Bezirksoberliga Mittelfranken in 1996 on the strength of a second place in the league. The club spent eight seasons in the Bezirksoberliga before winning the league in 2004 and gaining promotion to the Landesliga Bayern-Mitte for the first time.

In the Landesliga, the club performed well, too, archiving a fifth place in its first season. The following two seasons saw the club finishing third both times. Bayernliga promotion was finally achieved when the club won the Landesliga in 2008. After a 29-year absence, Bayernliga football returned therefore to the city of Erlangen. The last club from the city to play at this level was the BSC Erlangen in 1979.

The club established itself reasonably well in the new league, finishing in fifth place in 2008–09 and eighth in the following year. After the promotion of local rival SC Eltersdorf to the Bayernliga in 2011 the two clubs began to hold merger talks in November 2011. The club made negative headlines when it encountered financial trouble in 2011. Bruck averted insolvency in December 2011, caused by outstanding social security payments and wages, when it had to take up a €220,000 credit. The club announced that it would have to cut the budget of the football department. After initially proceeding with their Regionalliga Bayern licence application the club opted not to apply for a place in this league in April 2012 and instead remain in the Bayernliga, with the club's chairman Manfred Hopfengärtner stepping down. After a sixteenth place in 2014–15 the club had to enter the relegation round where it lost to 1. FC Sand and was relegated.

Honours
The club's honours:

League
 Landesliga Bayern-Mitte (V)
 Champions: 2008
 Bezirksoberliga Mittelfranken (VI)
 Champions: 2004, 2009‡
 Runners-up: 2002
 Bezirksliga Mittelfranken-Nord
 Runners-up: 1971, 1996, 2008‡
 A-Klasse Mittelfranken
 Champions: 1970, 1992
 B-Klasse Mittelfranken
 Champions: 1987

Cup
 Mittelfranken Cup
 Winner: 2000

Youth
 Bavarian Under 15 championship
 Runners-up: 2011
 ‡ Reserve team

Recent managers
Recent managers of the club:

Recent seasons
The recent season-by-season performance of the club:

FSV Erlangen-Bruck

FSV Erlangen-Bruck II

With the introduction of the Bezirksoberligas in 1988 as the new fifth tier, below the Landesligas, all leagues below dropped one tier. With the introduction of the Regionalligas in 1994 and the 3. Liga in 2008 as the new third tier, below the 2. Bundesliga, all leagues below dropped one tier. With the establishment of the Regionalliga Bayern as the new fourth tier in Bavaria in 2012 the Bayernliga was split into a northern and a southern division, the number of Landesligas expanded from three to five and the Bezirksoberligas abolished. All leagues from the Bezirksligas onwards were elevated one tier.

References

External links
Official team site
FSV Erlangen-Bruck profile on Weltfussball.de
Das deutsche Fußball-Archiv historical German domestic league tables 

Football clubs in Germany
Football clubs in Bavaria
Association football clubs established in 1916
Erlangen
Football in Middle Franconia
1916 establishments in Germany